The 2020–21 Trabzonspor season was the club's 53rd season in existence, all of which have been in the top flight of Turkish football. In addition to the domestic league, Trabzonspor participated in this season's edition of the Turkish Cup. Trabzonspor did not complete in any UEFA club competitions, having been banned by the UEFA Club Financial Control Body on 3 June 2020 due to breaches of the UEFA Financial Fair Play Regulations.

Players

Current squad

Intaken youth players

Out on loan

Signed during the season

Left during the season

Competitions

Süper Lig

League table

Results summary

Results by matchday

Matches
Note for matches with missing attendance numbers: It was concluded that matches would be played behind closed doors in the stadiums in Süper Lig for the first half of the season due to the coronavirus pandemic. This decision was altered before matchday 5 to allow spectators only into skyboxes with half capacity.

Turkish Cup

Turkish Super Cup

Statistics

Squad statistics

Notes

References

External links

Trabzonspor seasons
Trabzonspor